Grosset may refer to:
 Grosset Wines, an Australian winery
 Grosset & Dunlap, an American publisher